Goose bumps, goosebumps or goose-pimples are the bumps on a person's skin at the base of body hairs which may involuntarily develop when a person is tickled, cold or experiencing strong emotions such as fear, euphoria or sexual arousal.

The formation of goose bumps in humans under stress is considered to be a vestigial reflex. Its function in other apes is to raise the body's hair, and would have made human ancestors appear larger to scare off predators or to increase the amount of air trapped in the fur to make it more insulating. The reflex of producing goose bumps is known as piloerection or the pilomotor reflex, or, more traditionally, horripilation. It occurs in many mammals; a prominent example is porcupines, which raise their quills when threatened, or sea otters when they encounter sharks or other predators.

Anatomy and biology 
Goose bumps are created when tiny muscles at the base of each hair, known as arrector pili muscles, contract and pull the hair straight up. The reflex is started by the sympathetic nervous system, which is responsible for many fight-or-flight responses. The muscle cells connected to the hair follicle have been visualized by actin immunofluorescence.

Arrector pili muscle

Arrector pili muscles (APM) are smooth muscles which connect the basement membrane to the hair follicle. When these muscles contract, they increase the trapping of air on the surface of the skin and in turn, causes thermoregulation to the body. It used to be believed that each APM was connected to an individual hair follicle. More recent studies have disproved this and now explain that there can be multiple hair follicles connected to a single APM. In between the hair follicle and the APM there are lobules which form an angular shape. These lobules are sebaceous gland lobules which are supported by the APM.

Hair follicle

Hair follicles have four parts. There is the bulb, supra bulbar area, isthmus and infundibulum. The bulb is to be known as the part that is responsible for the growth of the rest of the hair follicle.

As a response to cold 
In animals covered with fur or hair, the erect hairs trap air to create a layer of insulation. Goose bumps can also be a response to anger or fear: the erect hairs make the animal appear larger, in order to intimidate enemies. This can be observed in the intimidation displays of chimpanzees, some New World monkeys like the cotton-top tamarin, in stressed mice and rats, and in frightened cats.

In humans 
In humans, goose bumps can even extend to piloerection as a reaction to hearing nails scratch on a chalkboard, listening to awe-inspiring music, or feeling or remembering strong and positive emotions (e.g., after winning a sports event), or while watching a horror film.
Some can deliberately evoke goose bumps in themselves without any external trigger. Such people tend to have the ability to increase their heart-rate and describe the event as a chill from the base of their skull down the body, that causes the increase in heart-rate and concurrent goose bumps on the skin especially the forearms which varies in duration. Further research is needed to discover more on such people.

Goose bumps are accompanied by a specific physiological response pattern that is thought to indicate the emotional state of being moved.

In humans, goose bumps are strongest on the forearms, but also occur on the legs, neck, and other areas of the skin that have hair. In some people, they even occur in the face or on the head.

Piloerection is also a classic symptom of some diseases, such as temporal lobe epilepsy, some brain tumors, and autonomic hyperreflexia. Goose bumps can also be caused by withdrawal from opiates such as heroin. A skin condition that mimics goose bumps in appearance is keratosis pilaris.

Causes

Extreme temperatures 
Goose bumps can be experienced in the presence of flash-cold temperatures, for example being in a cold environment, and the skin being able to re-balance its surface temperature quickly. The stimulus of cold surroundings causes the tiny muscles (arrector pili muscle) attached to each hair follicle to contract. This contraction causes the hair strands to stand straight, the purpose of which is to aid in quicker drying via evaporation of water clinging to the hair which is moved upward and away from the skin.

Intense emotion 
People often say they feel their "hair standing on end" when they are frightened or in awe. In an extremely stressful situation, the body can employ the "fight or flight" response. As the body prepares itself for either fighting or running, the sympathetic nervous system floods the blood with adrenaline (epinephrine), a hormone that speeds up heart-rate, metabolism, and body temperature in the presence of extreme stress. Then the sympathetic nervous system also causes the piloerection reflex, which makes the muscles attached to the base of each hair follicle contract and force the hair up.

Music 
Canadian researchers have suggested that when humans are moved by music, their brains behave as if reacting to delicious food, psychoactive drugs, or money. The pleasure experience is driven by the chemical dopamine, which produces physical effects known as "chills" that cause changes in heart-rate, breathing, temperature and the skin's electrical conductance. The responses correlate with the degree to which people rate the "pleasurability" of music. Dopamine release is greatest when listeners have a strong emotional response to music. "If music-induced emotional states can lead to dopamine release, as our findings indicate, it may begin to explain why musical experiences are so valued", wrote the scientists.

Ingestion 
Medications and herbal supplements that affect body temperature and blood flow may cause piloerection. For example, one of the common reported side effects of the intake of yohimbine is piloerection.

Opiate withdrawal 
Piloerection is one of the signs of opioid withdrawal. The term "cold turkey" meaning abrupt withdrawal from a drug, may derive from the goose bumps that occur during abrupt withdrawal from opioids; this resembles the skin of a refrigerated plucked turkey.

Voluntary control 
An unknown proportion of Cambodian nerves of people may consciously initiate the sensation and physiological signs of piloerection. The phenomenon is discovered spontaneously, appearing to be innate, and is not known to be possible to learn or acquire. Those with the ability frequently are unaware that it is not possible for everyone. The ability appears to correlate with personality traits associated with openness to experience.

Primate heritage hypothesis 
People often experience goose bumps as a reaction to the sound of fingernails being dragged across a chalkboard. In 2006 Vanderbilt psychologist Randolph Blake conducted a study to find out why people react that way to the sound. He noted that the core sound causing the reaction was acoustically similar to that of a primate distress call.

Etymology 

The term "goose bumps" derives from the phenomenon's association with goose skin. Goose feathers grow from pores in the epidermis that resemble human hair follicles. When a goose's feathers are plucked, its skin has protrusions where the feathers were, and these bumps are what the human phenomenon resembles.

It is not clear why the particular fowl, goose, was chosen in English (and German, Greek, Italian, Swedish, Danish, Norwegian, Polish and Czech) as most other birds share this same anatomical feature. Other languages may use a different species. For example, the hen or chicken is used in Vietnamese, Korean, Japanese, Finnish, Dutch, Luxembourgish, French, Spanish, Portuguese, Romanian and Galician; Irish uses both; Hebrew, the duck; the ants (referred to as "murashki", alluding to the feeling of ants crawling on ones skin) in Ukrainian and Russian; and a variety of synonyms in Mandarin.

Some authors have applied "goose bumps" to the symptoms of sexually transmitted diseases. "Bitten by a Winchester goose" was a common euphemism for having contracted syphilis in the 16th century. "Winchester geese" was the nickname for the prostitutes of Southern London, licensed by the Bishop of Winchester in the area around his London palace.

See also 
Autonomous sensory meridian response
Cold chill
Frisson

References

External links 

Skin physiology
Reflexes